Ercan Kesal (born 12 September 1959) is a Turkish actor, director, writer and physician.

Kesal graduated from Ege University's medical school in 1984. He worked as a physician at Keskin State Hospital, and at clinics in Balâ and the districts surrounding it.

He started his acting career in 2002 with a role in Nuri Bilge Ceylan's movie Uzak. He also wrote the script for the movie Bir Zamanlar Anadolu'da together with Ebru and Nuri Bilge Ceylan. In 2011, the movie received a nomination for the Best Script award at the Asia Pacific Screen Awards.

Aside from his career as an actor, he has published a number of books, including Peri Gazozu (2013), Nasipse Adayız (2015), Cin Aynası (2016), Bozkırda Bir Gece Yarısı (2017) and Aslında... (2017) by İletişim Yayınları and Evvel Zaman (2014) by İthaki Yayınları.

Filmography 

 Aldatmak, 2022 (Ali Sezai Okuyan)
 Beni Çok Sev, 2021 (Sedat)
 Üç Kuruş, 2021 (Halit)
 Menajerimi Ara, 2020 (guest appearance)
 Alef, 2020
 Nasipse Adayız, 2020
 Görülmüştür, 2019
 Çukur, 2017–2019; 2020; 2021 (İdris Koçovalı)
 Cehennem, 2017
 İçerde, 2016
 Ben O Değilim, 2014
 Hükümet Kadın 2, 2013
 Ben de Özledim, 2013
 Sen Aydınlatırsın Geceyi, 2013
 Yozgat Blues, 2013
 Hükümet Kadın, 2012
 Küf, 2012
 Bir Zamanlar Anadolu'da, 2011
 Albatrosun Yolculuğu, 2010
 Vavien, 2009
 Üç Maymun, 2008
 Uzak, 2002

Awards 
 20th Golden Boll Film Festival, 2013, Best Actor, Yozgat Blues
 Slovakia Art Film Festival, 2013, Best Actor, Küf
 32nd International Istanbul Film Festival, 2013, Best Actor, Yozgat Blues
 44th SİYAD Awards, 2011, Best Supporting Actor, Bir Zamanlar Anadolu'da
 44th SİYAD Awards, 2011, Best Script, Bir Zamanlar Anadolu'da
 1st Yeşilçam Film Academy Awards, 2011, Best Script, Bir Zamanlar Anadolu'da
 14th Sadri Alışık Awards, 2009, Best Supporting Actor, Üç Maymun
 2009 Yeşilçam Awards, 2009, Best Script, Üç Maymun

Bibliography 
 Peri Gazozu, Istanbul: İletişim Yayınları 2013
 Evvel Zaman, Istanbul: İthaki Yayınları 2014
 Nasipse Adayız, Istanbul: İletişim Yayınları 2015
 Cin Aynası, Istanbul: İletişim Yayınları 2016
 Bozkırda Bir Gece Yarısı, Istanbul: İletişim Yayınları 2017
 Aslında..., Istanbul: İletişim Yayınları 2017
 Kendi Işığında Yanan Adam - Tanıdığım Metin Erksan, Istanbul: İletişim Yayınları 2018
 Velhasıl, Istanbul: İletişim Yayınları 2019

References

External links 
 
 

1959 births
Turkish columnists
Turkish male film actors
20th-century Turkish physicians
Turkish male screenwriters
20th-century Turkish writers
21st-century Turkish writers
Turkish film directors
Living people
Ege University alumni
People from Avanos